Viatris Inc. is an American global pharmaceutical and healthcare corporation headquartered in Canonsburg, Pennsylvania. The corporation was formed through the merger of Mylan and Upjohn, a legacy division of Pfizer, on November 16, 2020.

The name of the corporation comes from the Latin words via, meaning path, and tris, which means three, referring to the path to three main objectives the corporation set.

Viatris ranked 254th on the 2021 Fortune 500 rankings of the largest United States corporations based on its 2020 total revenue.

History
On November 16, 2020, Upjohn merged with Mylan in a Reverse Morris Trust transaction and changed its name to Viatris. At that time, Michael Goettler became chief executive officer.
  
Following the combination, the company began trading on the NASDAQ using the ticker symbol VTRS.

In December 2020, the company announced a cost-reducing restructuring plan which would impact up to 20% of its global workforce, or 9,000 jobs at its facilities around the world.

In 2021, Viatris was ranked 5th by Fortune on its annual "Change the World" list.

In February 2022, Viatris announced an agreement where it will contribute to Biocon Biologics its biosimilars portfolio and related commercial and operational capabilities in exchange for up to $3.335 billion, including a stake of at least 12.9% in Biocon Biologics. The transaction was completed in November 2022.
In November 2022, the business agreed to acquire Oyster Point Pharma and Famy Life Sciences for an aggregate of $700–750 million to create an ophthalmology division. The acquisitions closed in January 2023.

In 2022, Viatris was recognized by Forbes as one of the world's best employers and by Newsweek as one of America's most responsible companies.

Predecessors
The following is an illustration of the company's major mergers and acquisitions and historical predecessors:

Viatris
Merger of Mylan and Upjohn
Mylan (Founded 1961, merged with Upjohn, 2020)
Somerset Pharmaceuticals (Acq 1989)
Dow B. Hickam (Acq 1991)
Bertek Inc (Acq 1993)
UDL Laboratories (Acq 1996)
Penederm Inc (Acq 1998)
Matrix Laboratories (Acq 2007)
Merck KGaA (Generics div.) (Acq 2007)
Bioniche Pharma Holdings (Acq 2010)
Pfizer Respiratory Delivery Platform (Acq 2011)
Agila Specialties (Acq 2013)
Abbott Laboratories (Generics div.) (Acq 2014)
Famy Care (Acq 2014)
Meda (Acq 2016)
Renaissance Acquisition Holdings (Dermatology div.) (Acq 2016)
Upjohn (Divested from Pfizer & merged with Mylan, 2020)
Famy Life Sciences (Acq 2023)
Oyster Point Pharma (Acq 2023)

Products
The company produces and sells a variety of medicines, with 1,400 approved therapeutic molecules in its portfolio. It owns brands (like Viagra, Xanax, Lipitor), generics, including branded and complex generics, biosimilars, and over-the-counter (OTC) drugs and active pharmaceutical ingredients. Viatris products cover therapeutic areas including cardiovascular, infectious disease, oncology, immunology, CNS and anesthesia, women's healthcare, diabetes and metabolism, gastroenterology, respiratory and allergy, and dermatology.

The following products have been newly launched or received regulatory approvals since Viatris was established:
 Abevmy (Bevacizumab), a biosimilar, received European Commission approval in April 2021.
 Hulio (Adalimumab), a biosimilar, was launched in Japan and Canada in February 2021.
 Kixelle (Insulin aspart), a biosimilar, received European Commission approval in February 2021.
 Dolutegravir received US FDA approval in December 2020 to treat children with HIV/AIDS in low to middle income countries. The formulation is strawberry-flavored to make it easier to give to children and was made available at a 75% discount compared to previous treatments.
 Semglee (Insulin glargine-yfgn) received the first interchangeable biosimilar approval from the US FDA in July 2021. The approval allows pharmacists to substitute Semglee for the reference product, Lantus. Branded and unbranded versions of the interchangeable biosimilars launched in November 2021.
 Breyna (Budesonide and Formoterol Fumarate Dihydrate Inhalation Aerosol) received approval from the US FDA in March 2022 as the first generic version of Symbicort for the treatment of asthma and COPD.

Partnerships
Following the formation of Viatris, the company became a member of the Biosimilars Forum, a trade organization that advocates for greater biosimilar usage.

Viatris partnered with the American College of Cardiology, the NCD Alliance, and the World Heart Federation to create the NCD Academy, a platform to help fight non-communicable diseases around the world.

In December 2020, the company worked with Sesame Workshop to create resources to help children and their caregivers manage their social and emotional needs impacted by the COVID-19 pandemic.

In April 2021, the company partnered with Atomo Diagnostics and Unitaid to expand access to HIV self-testing to 135 countries and lower the price of the tests by around 50%.

References

External links
 

2020 establishments in Pennsylvania
American companies established in 2020
Health care companies based in Pennsylvania
Manufacturing companies based in Pittsburgh
Pharmaceutical companies of the United States
Companies listed on the Nasdaq